The 2004 Texas Republican presidential primary was held on March 9 in the U.S. state of Texas as one of the Republican Party's statewide nomination contests ahead of the 2004 presidential election. Incumbent George W. Bush won the primary in a landslide.

Results

See also
 2004 Texas Democratic presidential primary
 2004 Republican Party presidential primaries
 2004 United States presidential election in Texas

References

Texas
Republican primary
Texas Republican primaries